Imperial Economic Conference may refer to:
1923 Imperial Conference of British Empire prime ministers held in London
The British Empire Economic Conference of prime ministers held in Ottawa in 1932